Hyllested is a Danish surname.

List of people with the surname 

 Henning Hyllested (born 1954), Danish politician
 Orla Hyllested (1912–2000), Danish trade unionist

See also 
 Hyllestad, Norway

Surnames of Danish origin
Danish-language surnames